Bekkhan Salavdinovich Goygereev (born May 22, 1987) is a Chechen-born Russian freestyle wrestler who won the gold medal at the 2013 World Wrestling Championships. He defeated Vladimir Dubov of Bulgaria to become the world champion.

References

External links
 

1987 births
Living people
Russian male sport wrestlers
Chechen martial artists
Russian people of Chechen descent
World Wrestling Champions
Universiade medalists in wrestling
Universiade gold medalists for Russia
European Wrestling Championships medalists
Medalists at the 2013 Summer Universiade
Sportspeople from Dagestan